The Mess Lake Lava Field is a volcanic field associated with the Mount Edziza volcanic complex of the Northern Cordilleran Volcanic Province in northwestern British Columbia, Canada. It lies northwest of the Spectrum Range on the Kitsu Plateau and consists of young basaltic lava flows and tephra. The source for the basaltic lava and tephra was three cinder cones, including Mess Lake Cone and The Ash Pit, which may be the youngest volcanic feature of the Mount Edziza volcanic complex.

The Mess Lake Lava Field is noticeable from satellite or aerial images due to its extremely black young basalt. Its westernmost and southwesternmost ends are flanked by the Mess Creek Escarpment, forming a steep prominent cliff. This cliff exposes several layers of black columnar basaltic lava flows with distal rock fragments and pyroclastic deposits. Eruptions of the young Mess Lake Lava Field basalts cascaded down this steep lava cliff similar to what occurs at the island of Hawaii and covered some of the columnar basalt jointing.

Near Mess Lake, inactive hot springs can be found and are most likely associated with the most recent eruptive activity in the Mess Lake Lava Field. Hot springs are closely associated with fumaroles, which are vents in an active volcanic area releasing steam and hot gases, such as sulfur dioxide. In general, the water is rotating groundwater that comes into contact with rocks heated by magma and finds openings to the surface. The formation of the springs depends both on the rocks the water has passed through and the profusion of volcanic discharges mixed with the groundwater. Iron oxide, iron sulfides and other substances usually color pools of boiling mud brilliant yellow, red, brown or green. Hot springs comprising significantly softened silica may deposit it to form siliceous sinter, whereas those comprising softened calcium carbonate deposit spongy-looking calcareous rock called tufa. Overflow of the springs can build masses, spires or stepped terraces of sinter or tufa.

See also
Desolation Lava Field
List of Northern Cordilleran volcanoes
List of volcanoes in Canada
Snowshoe Lava Field
Volcanology of Canada
Volcanology of Western Canada

References

Volcanism of British Columbia
Holocene volcanism
Northern Cordilleran Volcanic Province
Hot springs of British Columbia
Lava fields